Jubilant FoodWorks Limited  is an Indian food service company based in Noida, Uttar Pradesh which holds the master franchise for Domino's Pizza in India, Nepal, Sri Lanka and Bangladesh, for Popeyes in India, Bangladesh, Nepal and Bhutan, and also for Dunkin' Donuts in India. The company also operates two homegrown restaurant brands called Ekdum! and Hong's Kitchen. Jubilant FoodWorks is a part of the Jubilant Bhartia Group, owned by Shyam Sunder Bhartia (husband of Shobhana Bhartia) and Hari Bhartia.

History
On the recommendation of a friend who owned other foreign pizza licences, Shyam Sunder Bhartia and Hari Bhartia of the Jubilant Bhartia Group entered into a master franchise partnership with Domino's Pizza. Domino's Pizza India Private Ltd. was incorporated on 16 March 1995, and began operations in 1996. The company opened India's first Domino's Pizza outlet in New Delhi in 1996. The company changed its name to Jubilant FoodWorks Ltd in 2009. It was headed by Ajay Kaul since 2005. Pratik Rashmikant Pota became the CEO from April 2017. Pota announced his resignation in March 2022 and will step down in June.

On 24 February 2011, Jubilant FoodWorks signed a master franchise agreement with American coffeehouse chain Dunkin' Donuts to operate the brand in India. Jubilant FoodWorks opened India's first Dunkin' Donuts outlet in Connaught Place, New Delhi in April 2012. Jubilant FoodWorks was named "Emerging Food Group of the Year" by The Economic Times in 2012. The company launched its first homegrown brand called Hong's Kitchen, offering fast casual Chinese dining, with the first restaurant opening at Eros Mall in Gurugram on 13 March 2019. On 24 March 2021, Jubilant FoodWorks announced that it had entered into a master franchise and development agreement with Restaurant Brands International to operate Popeyes restaurants in India, Bangladesh, Nepal and Bhutan. The company opened India's first Popeyes outlet at Koramangala, Bangalore on 20 January 2022.

Jubilant FoodWorks suffered a security breach in April 2021 and hackers reportedly obtained 13 terabytes of data including 180 million order details, customer names, phone numbers, email IDs, addresses, payment details, and at least 1 million credit cards. In July 2021, Jubilant pledged to supply free pizza for life to Saikhom Mirabai Chanu, who won the silver medal at the 2020 Tokyo Olympics in Women's 49 kg weightlifting. Following her medal win, Chanu had told the media, "First of all, I will go and have a pizza. It has been a long time since I ate it. I will eat a lot today."

Acquisitions

On 19 February 2021, the company announced that it would acquire complete ownership of Netherlands-based Fides Food Systems Coöperatief UA for £24.80 million through its subsidiary Jubilant Foodworks Netherlands BV. The acquisition marks Jubilant FoodWorks entry into the Eurasian market. Fides held a 32.81% stake in DP Eurasia NV, which is the master franchisee for Dominos Pizza in Turkey, Russia, Azerbaijan and Georgia. Jubilant Foodworks announced that it had acquired an additional 6.98% stake in DP Eurasia (or 10,146,964 ordinary shares at a price of 95 pence per share), taking its total stake in the company to 39.79%. Jubilant announced the completion of the merger of Fides Food Systems Coeratief UA with Jubilant Foodworks Netherlands BV on 2 March 2022, and stated that it now owned 41.32% of DP Eurasia NV.

Domino's Pizza

India
The first Domino's Pizza in India opened in New Delhi in 1996. India surpassed the United Kingdom to become Domino's second-largest market in December 2014, behind the United States. Domino's Pizza operates 1,495 stores across 322 Indian cities as on 31 December 2021.

Domino's began accepting online orders in 2011, and online orders accounted for approximately 18-20% of total sales as of December 2013. On 19 March 2014, the 700th Domino's Pizza outlet was opened at HUDA City Centre metro station in Sector-29, Gurugram, Haryana. The company opened 47 new restaurants between January–March 2014 and 150 outlets in the 2013–2014 financial year. Domino's opened its 1000th outlet at Unity One Mall, Janakpuri, Delhi in January 2016.

In May 2016, the Centre for Science and Environment (CSE) reported that Domino's pizza bread was laced with toxins and carcinogens such as potassium bromate and potassium iodate. Potassium bromate is a category 2B carcinogen, meaning it can cause cancer. Potassium bromate was banned in India in June 2016. In 2017, a customer in Delhi claimed to have found live bugs in Domino's Pizza seasoning sachets. A video of the same went viral. This prompted Domino's to stop giving seasoning sachets for some time. When they restarted, they changed the packing from transparent to opaque.

Bangladesh
Jubilant Golden Harvest Ltd., a wholly-owned subsidiary of Jubilant FoodWorks, operates Domino's Pizza outlets in Bangladesh. Jubilant Golden Harvest Ltd. was established in early 2019 with Jubilant holding a 51% stake, and Bangladeshi company Golden Harvest Group holding the remaining 49%. The first Domino's Pizza outlet opened in Dhaka in February 2019. In September 2021, Jubilant FoodWorks exercised its first call option to acquire an additional 39% stake in the joint venture taking its ownership to 90%. On 22 March 2022, the company stated that it would exercise its second call option to acquire the remaining 10% stake. Jubilant FoodWorks announced that it had taken complete control of the joint venture in May 2022. The cost of the two call options to acquire the 49% stake was BD. One share in Jubilant Golden Harvest remains with a company nominee in order to comply with Bangladeshi regulations.

There are currently 13 Domino's Pizza outlets in Bangladesh.

Sri Lanka
Jubilant FoodWorks Lanka Pvt. Limited, a wholly-owned subsidiary of Jubilant FoodWorks, operates Domino's Pizza outlets in Sri Lanka. The first Domino's outlet opened in Colombo in February 2011. There were 23 Domino's Pizza outlets in Sri Lanka as of December 2017.

Dunkin' Donuts
On 24 February 2011, Jubilant FoodWorks signed a master franchise agreement with American coffeehouse chain Dunkin' Donuts to operate the brand in India. Jubilant FoodWorks opened India's first Dunkin' Donuts outlet in Connaught Place, New Delhi in April 2012. Apart from donuts, Munchkins, and coffee, the chain also serves vegetarian and non-vegetarian hot and cold food. Jubilant FoodWorks operates 29 Dunkin' Donuts outlets across 8 Indian cities as of 31 December 2021.

Popeyes 
On 24 March 2021, Jubilant FoodWorks announced that it had entered into a master franchise and development agreement with Restaurant Brands International to operate Popeyes restaurants in India, Bangladesh, Nepal and Bhutan. The company opened India's first Popeyes outlet at Koramangala, Bangalore on 20 January 2022.

Other brands

Hong's Kitchen
Jubilant FoodWorks launched its first homegrown brand called Hong's Kitchen, offering fast casual Chinese dining, with the first restaurant opening in Gurugram on 13 March 2019.

Ekdum!
Jubilant FoodWorks launched its second homegrown brand called Ekdum!, offering a variety of biryanis from across India in addition to kebabs, curries, breads, desserts and beverages. The first three Ekdum! restaurants were opened in Gurugram, Haryana in December 2020.

ChefBoss
Jubilant FoodWorks launched its first FMCG brand, ChefBoss in August 2020, ChefBoss is the Company’s brand that offers a range of ready-to-cook sauces, gravies and pastes. ChefBoss provides the perfect base so that the home chefs can add their magic and whip up new dishes effortlessly. With ChefBoss, you can try different cuisines anytime at home with ease.'

References

External links 

 
 Dunkin' Donuts India website
 Popeyes India website
 Domino's Pizza Sri Lanka website
 Domino's Pizza Bangladesh website 
 Ekdum! website
 Hong's Kitchen website
 ChefBoss website

Companies based in Noida
Indian companies established in 1995
Domino's Pizza
Pizza chains of India
Coffeehouses and cafés in India
Bakeries of India
1995 establishments in Uttar Pradesh
Companies listed on the National Stock Exchange of India
Companies listed on the Bombay Stock Exchange
Cybercrime in India